Fais  may refer to:
 Fais, Dutch singer-songwriter of Dutch and Moroccan descent.
 Fais Island, one of the outer islands of the State of Yap part of the Federated States of Micronesia
 Fabric Application Interface Standard
 French American International School (disambiguation)

See also 
 FAI (disambiguation)